A chief minister is an elected or appointed head of government of – in most instances – a sub-national entity, for instance an administrative subdivision or federal constituent entity. Examples include a state (and sometimes a union territory) in India; a territory of Australia; a province of Sri Lanka or Pakistan; a federal province in Nepal; an autonomous region of Philippines; or a British Overseas Territory that has attained self-governance. It is also used as the English version of the title given to the heads of governments of the Malay states without a monarchy.

The title is also used in the Crown Dependencies of the Isle of Man (since 1986), in Guernsey (since 2004), and in Jersey (since 2005).

In 2018 Sierra Leone, a presidential republic, created the role of an appointed chief minister, which is similar to a prime minister in a semi-presidential system. Before that, only Milton Margai had the same position between 1954 and 1958.

Meaning and role
The title has a similar construction and role as a first minister or minister-president but usually with a lower rank. The role has context within the Westminster system of government where a constitutional head of state (usually sub-national) is advised by ministers who usually head executive government departments (ministries). A chief minister is understood to be "first among equals". They would be the chief adviser to the nominal head of their state, the chair of cabinet and leader of the main governing political party in the legislature.

Chief ministers around the world

 Chief Minister of the Australian Capital Territory
 Chief Minister of the Northern Territory of Australia
 Chief Minister of Burma
 Chief Minister of Guernsey
 Chief Minister of Gibraltar
 Chief Minister (India)
 Chief Minister of Jersey
 Chief Minister of the Isle of Man
 Chief Minister of Montserrat
 Chief Ministers in Malaysia
 Chief minister (Nepal)
 Chief Minister (Pakistan)
 Chief Minister of Bangsamoro of the Philippines
 Chief Minister of Saint Helena
 Chief Minister of Sierra Leone
 Chief Minister of Singapore
 Chief Ministers in Sri Lanka
 Chief Minister of Mandalay Region
 List of chief ministers of Galmudug (Somalia)

Informal chief ministers
 Chief minister of France
 English chief ministers

See also

 Constitutional monarchy
 Governor
 Parliamentary leader

References

Heads of government
Positions of subnational authority
Gubernatorial titles